The Pennsylvania Poetry Society (PPS) is a non-profit state-level poetry association in the U.S. state of Pennsylvania, which is affiliated with the National Federation of State Poetry Societies (NFSPS). The organization promotes poetry, conducts monthly and annual contests, publishes poetry books and organizes periodic meetings, workshops and festivals.

History

The Pennsylvania Poetry Society (PPS), Inc. was founded October 21, 1949, growing out of the Pennsylvania Folklore Society and inaugurated by Colonel Henry W. Shoemaker and his sister, Blanche Shoemaker Wagstaff. The constitution was adopted in Philadelphia in June 1960. 
PPS is a non-profit organization of poets involved in the craft of poetry at the local, state, and national levels. The mission of the Pennsylvania Poetry Society is "to secure fuller recognition for poetry, to foster a better appreciation of it, and to assist Pennsylvania poets in their craft." The society's historical archives are housed at the State Archives Building in Harrisburg, Pennsylvania.

Activities

The Pennsylvania Poetry Society state affiliate chapters hold monthly workshops and meetings, sponsor a contest cycle and arrange for poetry readings, events and publication of anthologies featuring members' poems. The organization also promotes poetry in schools, colleges, retirement communities, and community programs. The PPS has hosted the NFSPS annual convention a number of times, including a conference in Philadelphia in 1960 and Harrisburg in 2005.

The organization publishes a newsletter, The Sylvan, and a periodic anthology of member poems titled PennEssence, both in electronic format. In addition, the society publishes a traditional anthology of annual award-winning poems, titled Prize Poems

References

External links

Poetry organizations
Literary societies
1949 establishments in Pennsylvania
Non-profit organizations based in Pennsylvania
501(c)(3) organizations
Arts organizations established in 1949